Kissing Jessica Stein is a 2001 American independent romantic comedy film, written and co-produced by the film's stars, Jennifer Westfeldt and Heather Juergensen. The film also stars Tovah Feldshuh and is directed by Charles Herman-Wurmfeld. It is one of the earlier film appearances of actors Jon Hamm and Michael Showalter. The film is based on a scene from the 1997 off-Broadway play by Westfeldt and Juergensen called Lipschtick.

Plot
28-year-old Jessica Stein is an attractive, Jewish, neurotic copy editor at a New York City newspaper. Her brother Dan has just gotten engaged, her best friend Joan is about to start a family, and her mother Judy is worried that Jessica will end up alone. Having endured several awful blind dates searching for Mr. Right, Jessica's interest is piqued by a personal ad that includes her favorite quote about relationships by Rilke. Jessica discovers it is in the "Women Seeking Women" section of the newspaper.

The ad was placed by Helen Cooper, who works at an art gallery. Dissatisfied with unfulfilling sex with men, Helen is looking to try something different and decides to experiment with dating women at the encouragement of her gay friends. Jessica replies to the ad, but she becomes apprehensive when she meets Helen, then apologizes and exits. Helen chases after her and persuades her to stay for one drink. The two discover they get along well and have a lot in common; they have dinner. Helen challenges Jessica's assumptions about what will make her happy and passionately kisses her goodnight.

Jessica and Helen start dating and awkwardly make out on Helen's sofa afterwards. The usually uptight Jessica gradually becomes more happy, confident, and carefree; this is noticed at her workplace and attracts interest from her boss, Josh. Jessica evasively says that she has not found a boyfriend. Helen, meanwhile, is falling in love with Jessica and grows frustrated that their relationship is not moving faster.

Judy invites Jessica and Helen to dinner at their holiday house, where she tries to set them each up with a computer executive and Josh, respectively. A thunderstorm causes Helen to sleep over in Jessica's old bed, where she and Jessica have sex for the first time. The two of them are happy together, but Jessica stays closeted about her new relationship, refusing to bring Helen as her date to Dan's wedding for fear of what others will think. Devastated, Helen says she cannot accept being treated as a shameful secret, and tearfully breaks off their relationship.

As Dan's wedding approaches, Jessica sinks into a deep depression and goes to see Judy, who tells her that she is a perfectionist who always quits things if they are not perfect, even if they make her happy.  Judy takes a deep breath and says that Jessica should not let this ruin her chances at happiness with Helen, who seems like "a lovely girl". Realizing her mother has accepted her sexuality, Jessica breaks down into tears of joy.

Jessica apologizes to Helen and invites her to be her date for Dan's wedding. Helen is a hit at the event and warmly welcomed into the family. Josh, meanwhile, has realized that he has been in love with Jessica for some time, and shares his feelings with her after the party. Jessica awkwardly but firmly explains that she is in a relationship with Helen and departs with her, leaving Josh speechless.

A few months later, Jessica and Helen are living together in Helen's apartment, where their sexual relationship begins to fade. Helen realizes that Jessica views her as a best friend and roommate more than a lover, and says that she needs more than Jessica is able to give. A fight ensues; Jessica implores Helen to accept their relationship as-is, but Helen remains steadfast to her need for a partner who satisfies her sexually, and the two split for good.

Several months later, Helen is happily living with another woman. Jessica is a more calm and content version of her former self, having taken the positive things she learned from her time with Helen and applied them to her own life. She puts up fliers in a bookstore seeking a new roommate, missing the flirtatious interest of the attractive store owner. She spots Josh among the bookshelves, whom she has not seen since she left the paper to focus on her painting. They have a friendly catching-up, and she tells him that Helen dumped her, which was tough, but ultimately made her a better person. She gives Josh a flyer with her email on it. Later, Jessica meets up with Helen—the two women now solidly friends—and joyfully tells her that she is going on a date with Josh.

Cast

 Jennifer Westfeldt as Jessica Stein
 Heather Juergensen as Helen Cooper
 Scott Cohen as Josh Myers
 Jackie Hoffman as Joan Levine
 Allen Fitzpatrick as Matthew Levine, Joan's Husband
 Tovah Feldshuh as Judy Stein
 Robert Ari as Sidney Stein
 Brian Stepanek as Peter
 John Cariani as Chuck
 Michael Mastro as Martin
 Carson Elrod as Sebastian
 Ben Weber as Larry
 Nick Corley as Howard
 David Aaron Baker as Danny Stein
 Jennifer Carta as Rachel, Danny's Fiancée
 Peter Hirsch as Stanley Schoenberg
 Jon Hamm as Charles
 Esther Wurmfeld as Grandma Esther
 Michael Ealy as Greg
 Michael Showalter as Stephen
 Tibor Feldman as Roland
 Ilana Levine as Helen's New Girlfriend
 Alysia Reiner as Schuller Gallery Artist
 Naomi Scott as Seductive Woman at Gallery
 Julie Lauren as Josh's Date
 Idina Menzel as Bridesmaid
 Vinny Vella as Cab Driver
 Adele Reichman as Grandma Interrogating Helen
 Hillel Friedman as Rabbi

Release

Festival screenings
The film premiered at the Los Angeles Film Festival on April 21, 2001, receiving the Audience Award for Best Feature Film and a Critics' Special Jury Award.

The film was next shown at the Toronto International Film Festival, with screenings scheduled the day before and the day after the 9/11 attacks.
According to the DVD commentary track by Westfeldt and Juergensen, both screenings took place, with the second screening on September 12 producing audible gasps among audience members at the sight of the World Trade Center. The two filmmakers decided to eliminate the nine or ten scenes featuring the Twin Towers because they were not integral to the story and distracted from it.

Critical reception
The film was hailed by critics upon release. It withstood some criticism from the LGBT community for not dealing in depth with the difficulties of being openly gay, but even among these criticisms, it was praised for portraying a same-sex relationship in a positive light. The website AfterEllen.com, which tracks the portrayal of lesbian and bisexual women in the media, reviewed the film positively. On Rotten Tomatoes, the film has an 83% "fresh" rating based on 120 reviews, with an average rating of 7.01/10.

The Advocate magazine listed the film as an essential film for LGBT viewers, stating that "By no means is it a model lesbian movie — in fact, the film is a more honest look at bisexuality and sexual fluidity — but it is certainly a movie that encourages exploration and self-awareness."

In the book Sexual Fluidity: Understanding Women's Love and Desire, Lisa M. Diamond cites the film as a notable example of female sexual fluidity in popular culture, writing that it "depicts a lesbian becoming involved with a man, contrary to the more widespread depictions of heterosexual women becoming involved in same-sex relationships."

References

External links
 
 
 
 
 

2001 films
2001 independent films
2001 LGBT-related films
2001 romantic comedy-drama films
American LGBT-related films
American romantic comedy-drama films
Female bisexuality in film
2000s English-language films
Films scored by Marcelo Zarvos
Films about LGBT and Judaism
American films based on plays
Films directed by Charles Herman-Wurmfeld
Films set in Manhattan
Films set in Westchester County, New York
Films shot in Connecticut
Films shot in New York (state)
Fox Searchlight Pictures films
Impact of the September 11 attacks on cinema
American independent films
Lesbian-related films
LGBT-related romantic comedy-drama films
2001 comedy films
2001 drama films
2000s American films